Kelsey's Homemade is an American cooking-themed television series that aired on Cooking Channel. It was presented by chef Kelsey Nixon. The series featured Nixon traveling to different eateries and then using the featured foods as inspiration for home-cooked meals for her family.

Episodes

References

External links
 
 

2010s American cooking television series
2015 American television series debuts
2015 American television series endings
Cooking Channel original programming
English-language television shows
Food reality television series
Television series by Rock Shrimp Productions